José Antonio Querejeta Altuna (born 19 March 1957) is a retired basketball player of Saski Baskonia, Real Madrid, Joventut Badalona and CAI Zaragoza, and the current president of Vitoria-Gasteiz-based Saski Baskonia since 1988, following the conversion of the club into a S.A.D.

From 2013 his Avtibask S.L. group also held a controlling stake in the city's football club Deportivo Alavés.

Honors
With Baskonia (as a player)
Copa Asociación: (1)
1985
With Baskonia (as a president)
Spanish Championship: (3)
2001–02, 2007–08, 2009–10
Spanish Cup: (6)
1995, 1999, 2002, 2004, 2006, 2009
Spanish Supercup: (4)
2005, 2006, 2007, 2008
Basque Cup: (2)
2011, 2012
FIBA Saporta Cup: (1)
1995–96

With Real Madrid
Spanish Championship: (2)
1979, 1980
Spanish Cup: (1)
1980
FIBA European Champions Cup: (1)
1979–80

Awards
Gianluigi Porelli EuroLeague Executive of the Year: (2)
2005, 2016

References

External links
Saski Baskonia official website
José Antonio Querejeta at ACB.com

1957 births
Living people
People from Goierri
Sportspeople from Gipuzkoa
Spanish men's basketball players
Liga ACB players
Joventut Badalona players
Real Madrid Baloncesto players
Saski Baskonia players
Small forwards
CB Zaragoza players
Deportivo Alavés
Spanish football chairmen and investors
Basketball players from the Basque Country (autonomous community)